Punjabi, or Panjabi, most often refers to:

 Something of, from, or related to Punjab, a region in India and Pakistan
 Punjabi language
 Punjabi people
 Punjabi dialects and languages

Punjabi may also refer to:
 Punjabi (horse), a British Thoroughbred racehorse
 HMS Punjabi, a British destroyer deployed during World War II
 Panjabi MC, British Indian musician
 Kurta, a garment known in parts of South Asia as a panjabi
 "Punjabi", a 2017 song by Timmy Trumpet and Dimatik

People with the surname
 Archie Panjabi (born 1972), British actress
 Kamya Panjabi (born 1979), Indian actress
 Raam Punjabi (born 1943), Indonesian movie producer

See also

 
 
 Punjab (disambiguation)

Language and nationality disambiguation pages